Galina Nikolayevna Strutinskaya (born 1 July 1957) is a Russian chess player, trainer and international arbiter. She won the Women's World Senior Chess Championship in 2011, 2012 and 2015 (the latter in the category 50+). The 2011 victory automatically earned her the title of Woman Grandmaster (WGM). Strutinskaya also won the Women's European Senior Chess Championship in the 50+ category in 2016 and 2017.

Strutinskaya played for Russia's second team in the Women's Chess Olympiad in 1994.

References

External links

1957 births
Living people
Chess woman grandmasters
Russian female chess players
Soviet female chess players
World Senior Chess Champions
Chess Olympiad competitors
Place of birth missing (living people)
Chess arbiters